Utricularia helix is an annual affixed aquatic carnivorous plant that belongs to the genus Utricularia (family Lentibulariaceae). It is endemic to Western Australia.

See also 
 List of Utricularia species

References 

Carnivorous plants of Australia
Eudicots of Western Australia
helix
Lamiales of Australia
Plants described in 1986